Emily Scott may refer to:

 Emily Scott (DJ) (born 1983), Australian DJ, model, record producer, and television personality
 Emily Scott (speed skater) (born 1989),  American short track speed skater
 Emily Scott (rugby union) (born 1992), English rugby union player
 Emily Maria Scott (1832–1915), American artist